Flok (formerly Loyalblocks) was an American tech startup based in New York City that provides marketing services such as chatbots/AI, customer loyalty programs, mobile apps and CRM services to local businesses.

In January 2017, the company was acquired by Wix.com. Around March 2017, Flok ceased communication.

On October 1, 2019, Flok communicated via email stating that Flok is shutting down on March 1, 2020.

On March 1, 2020, Flok communicated via email stating that Flok has officially shut down.

Background
Flok was founded in 2011 by Ido Gaver and Eran Kirshenboim and has offices in Tel Aviv, Israel. In May 2013, Flok secured a $9 million Series A Round from General Catalyst Partners with participation from Founder Collective and existing investor Gemini Israel Ventures. In total, Flok has raised over $18 million in venture capital in three rounds.

In May 2014, Flok announced a self-service loyalty platform for SMBs to build their own programs with beacon integration. At that time, approximately 40,000 businesses were using the service. In 2016, Flok released a turnkey chatbot service for local businesses, and was featured in AdWeek for developing the first weed bot chatbot for a California cannabis business.

Services
Flok offers an eponymous customer-facing app that consumers use to receive rewards and deals from partner businesses, and a Flok business app for merchants to manage the platform. Both are available for iOS and Android operating systems. Flok's main products center around customer loyalty and rewards. The platform offers a digital punch card, proximity marketing, push messaging and CRM services in addition to its chatbots and AI features.

Flok provides partner businesses with beacons that can locate customers and verify store visits. As of July 2016, Flok had a 4-star rating on Merchant Maverick review site.

References

External links
 

Companies based in New York (state)
Defunct software companies of the United States
Business intelligence companies
Software companies of Israel
Chatbots
Content management systems
Software companies established in 2011
Software companies disestablished in 2020
IOS software
Customer loyalty programs
2011 establishments in the United States
2011 establishments in New York (state)
Companies established in 2011
2017 mergers and acquisitions